Victor Morales may refer to:
Victor Morales (politician), Democratic politician in Texas
Víctor Morales (Chilean footballer) (1905–1938), member of the 1930 Chilean World Cup squads
Víctor Morales (Belizean footballer) (born 1982), Belize football player born in 1982
Victor Morales (Cuban architect), designed the Iglesia de Santa Rita de Casia on Quinta Avenida in Miramar, Havana, Cuba
Victor Morales (cyclist) (born 1943), Ecuadorian Olympic cyclist
Víctor Hugo Morales, Uruguayan journalist 
Víctor Hugo Morales Zapata, Costa Rican politician
Víctor Morales Mora, Costa Rican politician and lawyer